Newman is a city in Douglas County, Illinois, United States. The population was 778 at the 2020 census.

Newman has two restaurants: Pizza Man and the Corn Crib. It also has a Library District, a BP gas station and a bank. The main street is Broadway. The children go to school at Shiloh CUSD #1.

Geography

Demographics

As of the 2020 census there were 778 people, 364 households, and 240 families residing in the city. The racial makeup of the city was 93.44% White, 0.77% African American, 0.26% Native American, 0.51% Asian, 0.51% from other races, and 4.50% from two or more races. Hispanic or Latino of any race were 2.57% of the population.

There were 364 households, out of which 26.65% had children under the age of 18 living with them, 60.99% were married couples living together, 3.02% had a female householder with no husband present, and 34.07% were non-families. 27.75% of all households were made up of individuals, and 11.81% had someone living alone who was 65 years of age or older. The average household size was 2.42 and the average family size was 2.01.

The city's age distribution consisted of 13.9% under the age of 18, 2.4% from 18 to 24, 16.3% from 25 to 44, 22.7% from 45 to 64, and 44.8% who were 65 years of age or older. The median age was 61.2 years. For every 100 females, there were 85.4 males. For every 100 females age 18 and over, there were 81.3 males.

The median income for a household in the city was $58,125, and the median income for a family was $63,956. Males had a median income of $36,250 versus $28,393 for females. The per capita income for the city was $27,455. About 5.4% of families and 11.4% of the population were below the poverty line, including 21.8% of those under age 18 and 3.1% of those age 65 or over.

Notable residents
James Gammon - movie and television actor
Ben Roller - physician, professional wrestler and football player

References 

Cities in Illinois
Cities in Douglas County, Illinois